Emmelyne Kemp was born in Chicago. She is a pianist, vocalist, band leader, Broadway composer, actress, lecturer, and an American music researcher. She is a protégé of Eubie Blake. She is best known as a Broadway composer and actor for Bubbling Brown Sugar. She is known as an actor in the Woody Allen film Sweet and Lowdown. She has performed throughout the United States, Germany and Japan.

Early life
Born in Chicago, Kemp was a child prodigy at the age of three, and she grew up on gospel and the blues. She attended Morgan Park High School and advanced her musical skills at Northwestern University and two conservatories. She also served in the Women's Army Corps.

Music and Acting Career
Kemp's genre is blues, jazz, ragtime, gospel. She recorded with Eubie Blake. 
Her music label is Emme Kemp.

Her trio has consisted of Earl May (bassist), Earl Williams (drums).

Kemp performs on college campuses. She appeared in Woody Allen's film Sweet & Lowdown, starring Sean Penn. On Broadway, she composed music for, and acted in, Bubbling Brown Sugar, and wrote music for The American Dance Machine, and Don't Bother Me I Can't Cope, and Lorraine Hansberry's musical "Raisin.

She has performed her originals tunes on the Guiding Light and Captain Kangaroo.

She was coached with, and a student of Egon Petri.

Kemp is multilingual, performing in six languages.

Compositions
 Eyes on Harlem
 Someone To Sing To
 Composer for Bubbling Brown Sugar

Albums
 Try a Little Tenderness
 2009 - The New! Some One To Sing To

Awards
 Audelco Pioneer

References

External links
 Emme Kemp (medley)
 Emma Kemp with Trio and Interview
 Emme Kemp interview

Living people
African-American jazz musicians
African-American women composers
American women composers
American jazz composers
20th-century African-American women singers
African-American jazz composers
American women jazz singers
American jazz singers
African-American women singer-songwriters
Broadway composers and lyricists
20th-century American singers
20th-century American women singers
Jazz musicians from Chicago
Year of birth missing (living people)
21st-century African-American people
21st-century African-American women
Singer-songwriters from Illinois